Jaskari is a surname. Notable people with the surname include:

Aaro Jaskari (1880–1925), Finnish politician
Aatos Jaskari (1904–1962), Finnish wrestler
Mikko Jaskari (1866–1936), Finnish politician
Tauno Jaskari (born 1934), Finnish wrestler

Finnish-language surnames